Jan Alinč (born 27 May 1972) is a Czech former ice hockey player. He competed in the men's tournament at the 1994 Winter Olympics.

Career statistics

Regular season and playoffs

International

References

External links
 

1972 births
Czechoslovak ice hockey centres
HC Litvínov players
HC Karlovy Vary players
HC Slavia Praha players
Ässät players
Ice hockey players at the 1994 Winter Olympics
Living people
Olympic ice hockey players of the Czech Republic
People from Louny
Pittsburgh Penguins draft picks
Sportspeople from the Ústí nad Labem Region
Czech expatriate ice hockey players in Germany
Czech expatriate ice hockey players in Sweden
Czech expatriate ice hockey players in Finland
Czech ice hockey centres